Dyffryn, Neath Port Talbot may refer to:
Dyffryn Cellwen
Dyffryn Clydach
Dyffryn School